is a Japanese footballer who plays for MIO Biwako Shiga.

Club statistics
Updated to 23 February 2018.

References

External links

Profile at YSCC Yokohama
Profile at Fujieda MYFC

1992 births
Living people
Toyo University alumni
Association football people from Saitama Prefecture
Japanese footballers
J3 League players
Japan Football League players
YSCC Yokohama players
Fujieda MYFC players
MIO Biwako Shiga players
Association football forwards